Kevin Gary Duers (born 30 June 1960 in Lusaka, Zambia) is a former Zimbabwean cricketer. He played six One Day Internationals (ODIs) for Zimbabwe in 1992. After the 1992 Cricket World Cup, he retired from cricket due to an injury. He now coaches at local teams as well as the Essex youth teams in England.

References

External links

1960 births
Living people
Sportspeople from Lusaka
White Zimbabwean sportspeople
Mashonaland cricketers
Zimbabwe One Day International cricketers
Zimbabwean cricketers
Cricketers at the 1992 Cricket World Cup